Bruno Goyens de Heusch (born 15 March 1959) is a Belgian equestrian. He competed in the individual eventing at the 2000 Summer Olympics.

References

External links
 

1959 births
Living people
Belgian male equestrians
Olympic equestrians of Belgium
Equestrians at the 2000 Summer Olympics
People from Ixelles
Sportspeople from Brussels